The Goldene Sieben ("Golden Seven") was a German jazz ensemble.

The Goldene Sieben was created in 1934 as the house band for the Berlin-based label Electrola. Henri Rene picked its initial members from noted local ensembles, but by 1935 the group was led by Georg Haentzschel. The group was broadcast on radio, though its contract forbade them from performing live. They appeared in the 1937 film Heimweh and recorded extensively.

Members
Trumpet
Kurt Hohenberger

Trombone
Willy Berking
Erhard Krause

Guitar/Banjo
Henri Rene

Clarinet
Ernst Hollerhagen
Franz Thon

Saxophone
Eddie Brunner
Kurt Wege

Piano
Willy Stech
Peter Igelhoff
Georg Haentzschel

Drums
Freddie Brocksieper

References
Rainer E. Lotz, "Goldene Sieben". The New Grove Dictionary of Jazz, 1994, pp. 435–436.

German jazz ensembles